FC Belize was a Belizean football team which competed in the Premier League of Belize (PLB) of the Football Federation of Belize. They were based in Belize City and last competed in 2015 before financial issues and the death of owner Lionel Welch forced them to withdraw. Their home stadium, the MCC Grounds, was closed in June 2014 by the Belize National Sports Council and FC Belize was relocated to Louisiana Football Field in Orange Walk Town.

Achievements
Belize Premier Football League: 2
2006, 2007

2014–15 squad

Managers
 Marvin Ottley (2005–2007)
 Eian Henry (2007–2013)
 Jorge Nunez (2014–2015)

Old logos

References

External links
FC Belize

Football clubs in Belize
2005 establishments in Belize
Association football clubs established in 2005